Cerylon ferrugineum is a species of Cerylonidae native to Europe.

References

Cerylonidae
Beetles described in 1830
Beetles of Europe